Duhamel is a hamlet in the central Alberta, Canada within Camrose County.

History 
An early trading post was situated 2-3 miles northwest of the hamlet's current site, directly on a well-used ford of the Battle River.  
The trading post was a key point for exchange between the First Nations people, fur traders, and the Hudson's Bay Company.

The settlement that grew around the post took the names Battle River Crossing and Salois's settlement or Abraham's settlement, after Abraham Salois, a prominent settler and freighter. It was also known as Laboucane, after the Laboucane brothers and their families, who were among the first local residents.
 
A church was built in 1883 for the service of Father Bellevaire, and was visited by Bishop Grandin, who named the settlement after Joseph-Thomas Duhamel. 

Around 1886, the post was moved to the site where Highway 21 now crosses the river.

In 1910, Duhamel moved to its present location on the newly constructed Grand Trunk Pacific rail line from Tofield to Calgary. The Duhamel/Battle River rail bridge was one of the largest wooden rail bridges ever constructed, at 3,972 feet (1210 m) in length and 120 feet (32 m) in height.

Geography 
Nearby communities include:
 New Norway
 Ferintosh
 Camrose
 Bittern Lake

Demographics 

Crop circles 
Crop circles appeared in a farmer's field in Duhamel in 1967. At the time, crop circles were virtually unknown. The discovery of the circles was preceded by reports of UFO sightings around the town.

A farmer by the name of Schielke discovered the strange occurrence on Saturday, August 5, 1967, after a night of heavy rains. This was the first time he had been to his fields in weeks, so the circles could have appeared at any time during that period. Schielke always stressed that the marks could not have been made by his equipment, and that he did not believe in UFOs. 

The marks varied from five to seven inches wide, and the smallest circular mark was 31 ft., 9 in. in diameter. Three of the rings were essentially circular, with the largest mark being slightly elliptical, varying from 34 ft., 5 in. to 36 ft., 3 in. There were no exhaust blasts, scorch marks or disturbances of the soil, and  vegetation within the circles had apparently been removed by the object that made the marks. The official investigation report implies that the marks were most likely left by a 135-ton aircraft or spacecraft.

This case is described as "unsolved" by Canada's Department of National Defence.

See also 
List of communities in Alberta
List of designated places in Alberta
List of hamlets in Alberta

References 

 Memory Opens the Door (New Norway and District 1972) - local history book, no ISBN
Canada's Unidentified Flying Objects: The Search for the Unknown at Library and Archives Canada

Camrose County
Hamlets in Alberta
Designated places in Alberta